Nemopoda nitidula is a European species of flies and member of the family Sepsidae.

References

Sepsidae
Diptera of Europe
Taxa named by Carl Fredrik Fallén
Insects described in 1820